or World Hall is a multi-purpose arena located in the Chūō-ku Ward of Kobe, Japan. It has a maximum capacity of 8,000 people and is optimized for large-scale meetings, sport events, trade shows and concerts. It is located on the artificial island of Port Island, along with numerous convention centers, hotels and universities.

Notable events
 Cosmopolis Show 1985 opening arena used for Olympics training*
 Host of the official 1991 Asian Basketball Championship
 Since 2003, Dragon Gate has held their largest show of the year, Kobe Puroresu Festival, at the venue in July.
 12 March 2005, Avril Lavigne performed as part of her Bonez Tour.
 6 December 2007, Daft Punk performed Alive 2006/2007.
 31 December 2010: Luna Sea performed their first New Year's Eve "countdown concert", as part of their 20th Anniversary World Tour Reboot -to the New Moon- reunion tour.
 24, 25 September 2011: 2NE1 NOLZA (2011)
 2 June 2012: 2012 Shinhwa Grand Tour in Japan: The Return – the comeback concert of South Korean boy band Shinhwa, after a four-year hiatus due to mandatory military service.
 Since 2012, New Japan Pro-Wrestling has held their annual September Destruction pay-per-view at the venue.
 9, 10 February 2013: Girls' Generation, Girls & Peace: 2nd Japan Tour
 17,18 August 2013: SHINee, Shinee World 2013
 7, 8 September 2013: T-ara Japan Tour 2013: Treasure Box
 15, 16 October 2013 : Backstreet Boys performed during their In A World Like This Tour. 
 19, 20 November 2013: B.A.P 1st Japan Tour: Warrior Begins
 23, 24 November 2013: Kara's 2nd Japan Tour 2013
 29 March 2014: Lionel Richie All Night Long Tour 2014.
 23, 24, 25 May 2014: Girls' Generation, Girls' Generation Japan 3rd Tour 2014
 12, 13 July 2014: 2NE1 AON: All Or Nothing World Tour 2014
 4, 5 August 2015: Junho from 2PM, 3rd Solo Tour 2015: LAST NIGHT
 18, 19, 20 December 2015: Girls' Generation, Girls' Generation's Phantasia
 26, 27 & 28 December 2015: BTS, 2015 BTS LIVE <花樣年華 on stage> Japan Edition
 20, 21 February 2016: iKON, iKONCERT 2016: Showtime Tour
 22 January 2017: Guns N' Roses, Not in This Lifetime... Tour
 15, 16, 18 February 2017: Seventeen, 'LIKE SEVENTEEN – Shining Diamond' in Japan CONCERT
 19, 20 August 2017: Aqours, "Aqours 2nd Love Live! HAPPY PARTY TRAIN TOUR"
 20, June 2018: Bullet Train, "Sweetest Battlefield Arena Tour 2018"
 12, 13, 14 October 2018: Twice, Twice 1st Arena Tour 2018 "BDZ"
 12, 13 January 2019: Red Velvet, Red Velvet 2nd Concert "REDMARE"
 2, 3 February 2019: GOT7, GOT7 ARENA SPECIAL 2018–2019 "Road 2 U"
 5 May 2019: FTISLAND, FTISLAND FIVE TREASURES LIVE TOUR 2019
 2 June 2019: Rizin 16 – Kobe
 1 September 2019: Iz*One – IZ*ONE 1st Concert "Eyes On Me"
 11, 12 June 2022: Stray Kids – Stray Kids 2nd World Tour "Maniac" in Japan
 4, 5 October 2022: NiziU - NiziU Live with U 2022 "Light It Up"
 21, 22, 24, 25 December 2022: Treasure – Treasure Japan Arena Tour 2022–2023
 23, 24 February 2023: Ive - Ive The 1st Fan Concert <The Prom Queens> in Japan

References

External links
 Official site
 Profile at structurae.de

Basketball venues in Japan
Buildings and structures in Kobe
Indoor arenas in Japan
Boxing venues in Japan
Event venues established in 1984
Tourist attractions in Kobe
1984 establishments in Japan
International Premier Tennis League